Lilit Harutyunyan (born April 4, 1993 in Gyumri) is an Armenian Track and field athlete who competes in the 400 metres hurdles. She competed at the 2016 Summer Olympics.

Personal Bests

References

External links 
 

1993 births
Living people
Sportspeople from Gyumri
Athletes (track and field) at the 2010 Summer Youth Olympics
Athletes (track and field) at the 2016 Summer Olympics
Olympic athletes of Armenia
Armenian female sprinters
Armenian female hurdlers